Maculabo Island or Macolabo Island is an island barangay in the Philippines in the municipality of Paracale, Camarines Norte. The island serves as a major stop-over going to Tinaga Island where the well-known long beach Mahabang Buhangin is located. Locals reside on parts of the island with farming and fishing as their main source of income.

References

Islands of Camarines Norte